Damage was an American, New York City-based hardcore band, oparting from circa 1983 to 1988.

Members
Original members, 1983–1985: Boot (Steve Hudecek), Mike Kirkland, Steve McAllister, Denny Morrison, Ted Warner
Second lineup, 1985–1986: Patrick Blanck, Mike Kirkland, Steve McAllister, Denny Morrison, Ted Warner
Third lineup, 1987–1988: Steve McAllister, Sean McDonough, Virgil Moorefield, Denny Morrison, Ted Warner

Discography

Albums
 Sins of Our Fathers (Gnarl) – 1984 
 Recorded Live Off the Board at CBGB (Celluloid) – 1986

Compilation albums
 Mutiny on the Bowery (Mystic Records) – 1986  
 There's a Method to Our Madness (Phantom Records) – 1986 
 Recorded Live Off the Board at CBGB (CBGB / Off the Board Records) – 1987

References

External links
Damage page on goodbadmusic.com

Hardcore punk groups from New York (state)